Daniel Gee (30 December 1876 – 16 January 1947) was an Australian cricketer. He played two first-class matches for New South Wales between 1903/04 and 1913/14.

See also
 List of New South Wales representative cricketers

References

External links
 

1876 births
1947 deaths
Australian cricketers
New South Wales cricketers
Cricketers from Sydney